The following events occurred in August 1937:

August 1, 1937 (Sunday)
The Meuse-Argonne American Memorial was dedicated in Montfaucon-d'Argonne, France.
Born: Al D'Amato, lawyer and politician, in Brooklyn, New York

August 2, 1937 (Monday)
The Marihuana Tax Act was enacted in the United States.

August 3, 1937 (Tuesday)
The 20th biennial World Zionist Congress opened in Zürich, Switzerland.
A Pan American-Grace Airways Sikorsky S-43 amphibious aircraft plunged into the ocean 20 miles off Cristóbal, Panama, killing all 14 aboard.
Generalissimo Francisco Franco informed Italy that he had intelligence that the Soviets were shipping arms to the Republic. Franco urged Italian action to stop the transports.

August 4, 1937 (Wednesday)
The Venezuelan National Guard was founded.
In Little Rock, Arkansas, the newly formed Society for the Booing of Commercial Advertisements in Motion Picture Theatres made its debut, booing loudly when corporate advertising appeared on the movie screen. Similar "booing clubs" soon began springing up elsewhere. In the 1930s and '40s movie houses experimented with running ads for commercial products alongside movie trailers, but many theatregoers resented the practice because, unlike the radio where ads were recognized as necessary, movies were not free.
Born: David Bedford, composer and musician, in Hendon, London, England (d. 2011)
Died: K.P. Jayaswal, 55, Indian historian and lawyer; Hans Reck, 51, German volcanologist and paleontologist

August 5, 1937 (Thursday)
Japanese Emperor Hirohito ratified a directive removing the constraints of international law on the treatment of Chinese prisoners of war.
Frankie Frisch of the St. Louis Cardinals appeared in his final major league game, going 0-for-1 as a pinch hitter during a 4–1 loss to the Boston Bees.
Born: Herb Brooks, ice hockey player and coach, in Saint Paul, Minnesota (d. 2003)

August 6, 1937 (Friday)
The Soviet Union and the United States agreed to extend their trade pact for one additional year.
The National Cancer Institute was established in the United States.
Born: Barbara Windsor, actress, in Shoreditch, London, England (d. 2020)

August 7, 1937 (Saturday)
The Japanese began to evacuate their concession at Hankou, citing "the steadily growing tension and a desire to prevent an incident likely to aggravate the general situation."
Born: Magic Slim, blues singer and guitarist, in Torrance, Mississippi (d. 2013)
Died: Henri Lebasque, 71, French post-Impressionist painter

August 8, 1937 (Sunday)
3,000 Japanese soldiers conspicuously entered Beiping without resistance. Japanese warplanes dropped propaganda leaflets on the populace proclaiming that the "Japanese army has driven out your wicked rulers and their wicked armies and will keep them out."
Born: Dustin Hoffman, actor and director, in Los Angeles
Died: Jimmie Guthrie, 40, Scottish motorcycle racer (killed competing in the German motorcycle Grand Prix)

August 9, 1937 (Monday)
It was announced in Berlin that The Times correspondent Norman Ebbutt had been ordered out of Germany. The move was made in retaliation for Britain expelling three German journalists on suspicion of espionage.
The adventure film Souls at Sea starring Gary Cooper, George Raft and Frances Dee premiered at the Globe Theatre in New York City.
Died: Duff Cooley, 64, American baseball player

August 10, 1937 (Tuesday)
The Republican tanker Campeador was sunk off Tunis by Italian destroyers. 28 members of the crew were saved but 12 were lost.
The Regional Defence Council of Aragon was dissolved.
An Eastern Air Lines Douglas DC-2 struck a power pole while taking off from Daytona Beach Airport. Both crew members and 2 of the 7 passengers aboard were killed.
Claude Shannon wrote A Symbolic Analysis of Relay and Switching Circuits, later described by Howard Gardner as "possibly the most important, and also the most famous, master's thesis of the century".
One of the leading camera and business equipment brand in world, Canon is founded, as predecessors for Precision Optical Company in Japan.

August 11, 1937 (Wednesday)
The Battle of Albarracín ended in a Nationalist victory.
Chiang Kai-shek ordered some of his best units deployed to Shanghai.
The World Zionist Congress voted 300–158 to oppose the Peel Commission plan to partition Palestine.
The biographical film The Life of Emile Zola starring Paul Muni premiered at the Hollywood Theatre in New York City.
Died: Edith Wharton, 75, American author

August 12, 1937 (Thursday)
The Spanish destroyer Churruca was torpedoed and damaged near Cartagena. The ship was able to limp into port but 3 crew were killed and 9 were injured.
Died: Bakr Sidqi, 47, Iraqi nationalist and general (assassinated)

August 13, 1937 (Friday)
The Battle of Shanghai began.
The freighter Conde de Absolo was sunk off Pantelleria by the Italians.
Died: Walter Runciman, 1st Baron Runciman, 90, English shipping magnate

August 14, 1937 (Saturday)
The Battle of Santander began.
Chinese warplanes attacked Japanese ships in Shanghai harbour, but most of the bombs missed their targets and struck civilian areas instead, killing over 1,000.
Born: Alberta Nelson, actress, in Erie, Pennsylvania (d. 2006)
Died: Herman Cyril McNeile, 48, British popular author.  West Chiltington, England.

August 15, 1937 (Sunday)
Japanese planes bombed Nanking for the first time.
The Shanghai Expeditionary Army was raised a second time.
Félix Paiva became 37th President of Paraguay.

August 16, 1937 (Monday)
A general mobilization of the military was ordered in Japan.
The Polish peasant strike began.
France protested to the Chinese government over the air raid that killed more than 1,000 people in the French concession and international settlement of Shanghai.
Born: David Anderson, politician, in Victoria, British Columbia; Uncle Elmer, professional wrestler, in Philadelphia, Mississippi (d. 1992)

August 17, 1937 (Tuesday)
The U.S. Senate confirmed Hugo Black for the United States Supreme Court by a 63–16 vote despite his controversial past involvement with the Ku Klux Klan.
Born: Diego Seguí, baseball player, in Holguín, Cuba

August 18, 1937 (Wednesday)
The Blackwater fire began in Shoshone National Forest in Wyoming.
The U.S. government ordered all 12,600 American citizens in China to evacuate.
The musical film Broadway Melody of 1938 starring Eleanor Powell, Robert Taylor and Judy Garland in a starmaking role premiered at Grauman's Chinese Theatre in Hollywood.
Born: Jean Alingué Bawoyeu, Prime Minister of Chad, in Fort-Lamy, French Equatorial Africa; Willie Rushton, cartoonist and comedian, in Chelsea, London, England (d. 1996)
Died: Luigi Pernier, 62, Italian archaeologist and academic

August 19, 1937 (Thursday)
Portugal severed diplomatic relations with Czechoslovakia over a broken armaments contract. Czechoslovakia broke the contract because it suspected Portugal of funneling the arms to the Nationalists in Spain.
Nazi Germany restricted Jewish booksellers to only selling books by Jewish authors to Jewish customers.
Died: Ikki Kita, 54, Japanese author and philosopher

August 20, 1937 (Friday)
In Shanghai, an anti-aircraft shell landed on the deck of the heavy cruiser  and exploded, killing 1 American sailor and wounding 18.
Born: Jim Bowen, comedian and television personality, in Heswall, England (d. 2018); Jean-Louis Petit, composer, conductor and organist, in France

August 21, 1937 (Saturday)
The Sino-Soviet Non-Aggression Pact was signed.
Villacarriedo fell to the Nationalists.
Born: Gustavo Noboa, President of Ecuador (2000-2003) (d. 2021); Donald Dewar, politician, in Glasgow, Scotland (d. 2000); Joe Morrison, American football player and coach, in Lima, Ohio (d. 1989); Robert Stone, novelist, in Brooklyn, New York (d. 2015); Chuck Traynor, pornographer, in Westchester County, New York (d. 2002)
Died: George Wright, 90, American baseball player

August 22, 1937 (Sunday)
Manfred von Brauchitsch of Germany won the Monaco Grand Prix.
Rudolf Caracciola of Germany won the Swiss Grand Prix.
Voters in Liechtenstein approved a referendum on banning department stores.

August 23, 1937 (Monday)
The new Metro-Goldwyn-Mayer cartoon studio opened its doors.
Died: Albert Roussel, 68, French composer

August 24, 1937 (Tuesday)
The Republicans launched the Zaragoza Offensive.
The Battle of Belchite began.

August 25, 1937 (Wednesday)
The Nationalists entered Santander.
The Polish peasant strike ended.

August 26, 1937 (Thursday)
British ambassador to China Hughe Knatchbull-Hugessen was wounded when a Japanese plane strafed and attacked his limousine.
Turkey warned that any submarines that entered the Turkish Straits without identifying themselves would be attacked.
Mysterious attacks began on neutral shipping bound for Republican ports.
Born: Kenji Utsumi, voice actor and actor, in Kitakyushu, Japan (d. 2013); Gennady Yanayev, politician, in Perevoz, Nizhny Novgorod Oblast, USSR (d. 2010)
Died: Andrew W. Mellon, 82, American businessman, ambassador and Secretary of the Treasury

August 27, 1937 (Friday)
The Kwantung Army occupied Zhangjiakou.
Born: Alice Coltrane. jazz musician, in Detroit, Michigan (d. 2007)

August 28, 1937 (Saturday)
H. S. Wong took the famous Bloody Saturday photograph, showing a baby crying in the bombed-out ruins of a Shanghai railway station.
The Vatican recognized Francoist Spain and sent an apostolic delegate. 
English athlete Sydney Wooderson set a new world record at Motspur Park by running a mile in 4 minutes 6.4 seconds.

August 29, 1937 (Sunday)
Britain sent a sharp note of protest to the Japanese government demanding a formal apology for the wounding of their ambassador.
Born: James Florio, 49th Governor of New Jersey, in Brooklyn, New York

August 30, 1937 (Monday)
Joe Louis retained boxing's World Heavyweight Championship with a 15-round decision over Tommy Farr at Yankee Stadium.
The Russian freighter Timiryazev was torpedoed and sunk near Dellys. All 30 crew were rescued by a fishing boat. 
Eberhard von Stohrer was appointed the new German ambassador to the Spanish Nationalist government.
Born: Bruce McLaren, race car driver, in Auckland, New Zealand (d. 1970)
Died: Adele Sandrock, 74, German-Dutch actress

August 31, 1937 (Tuesday)
Actors Tallulah Bankhead and John Emery were married in Jasper, Alabama.
Born: Bobby Parker, blues-rock musician, in Lafayette, Louisiana (d. 2013)

References

1937
1937-08
1937-08